The Tan Chay Wa's tombstone trial was a sequence of unusual events regarding an inscribed tombstone of a political dissident, Tan Chay Wa, that sparked a court case in Singapore in 1983. His older brother Tan Chu Boon was arrested and charged on suspicion that he designed an elaborate but 'subversive' tombstone, which had engraved on it words glorifying the communist cause. The story of the case was later taken up in London by The Sunday Times a few months after the trial, making the case an internationally known issue.

History
The Malayan National Liberation Front (MNLF), an organisation of the Communist Party of Malaya (CPM), was formed in 1968 to support the overthrow of the governments of Singapore and Malaysia. The countries had been declared independent in 1965, but the communists rejected their separation. From 1968 to 1974, the armed struggle included planting booby trap bombs in public places. The MNLF was also involved in collecting supplies such as medicine, explosives and assorted equipment for the Malayan National Liberation Army (MNLA), which was the military arm of the CPM operating in the border area of northern Malaysia and southern Thailand.

In 1976, after a prolonged investigation, Singapore's Internal Security Department arrested hundreds of MNLF members together with many documents, arms and explosives in a sting operation in Singapore. Twenty-three members were released after interrogation, seventeen were detained without trial under the Internal Security Act (ISA) and ten turned over to the Malaysian police for suspected involvement in terrorist activities in Malaysia.

Tan Chay Wa

Tan Chay Wa (1948–1983), a political dissident and a senior official of the MNLF, managed to escape from Singapore to Malaysia as the ISD officers closed in on him. Chay Wa was a bus driver and a married man living in Singapore. On 2 June 1979, Chay Wa was arrested at a vegetable farm in Johor; he had a .32 Llama semi-automatic pistol and seven bullets in his possession. He was convicted under Malaysia's Essential Security Cases (Amendment) Regulations (ESCAR) by Johor Bahru's High Court, which provides for a mandatory death penalty. During his detention, there was an offer by the Government of Belgium to grant him political asylum should he be allowed to leave Malaysia. However, he was hanged on 18 January 1983 in Kuala Lumpur's Pudu Prison.

Chay Wa's body was brought back to Singapore by his older brother, Tan Chu Boon. Chu Boon arranged for his brother's body to be buried in Choa Chu Kang Cemetery on 20 January 1983. However, Chu Boon was arrested by the Criminal Investigation Department (CID) Secret Society Investigation Branch at his flat on 28 May 1983 on suspicion that he designed an elaborate but subversive tombstone, which had engraved on it words glorifying the communist cause.

'Subversive' tombstone trial
At his November 1983 trial, Chu Boon argued in court that he was neither a communist nor did he have political leanings of any kind; he did not monitor or even read the proposed inscription handed to him on a piece of paper by his brother's widow, which was given to the tombstone inscriber. The inscription in Chinese, written in emotive language, read:

The court then heard that the CID started investigating the tombstone on 11 May 1983 and had seized the original piece of paper from the tombstone-maker's shop in Choa Chu Kang. Chu Boon's defence lawyer was J.B. Jeyaretnam who had long been a consistent thorn in the side of Singapore's political establishment. Jeyaretnam established that the instigation for the CID investigation and arrest had come from "a government department". In mitigation, Jeyaretnam made the point that, apart from immediate family and friends, the public would not have known about the 'subversive' tombstone nor its inscription in Singapore's biggest cemetery.

The court threw out Chu Boon's defence plea and he was convicted on grounds that he had "under his control, the tombstone of his brother, Tan Chay Wa, on which was engraved in Chinese characters an inscription which tended to advocate acts prejudicial to the security of Singapore." He was sentenced to a year in jail; on appeal this was reduced to a month.

Unintended publicity
The court case hearing of Chu Boon had one unintended consequence; it made Chay Wa much better known to the public than he may otherwise have been. As a result, the story was later taken up in London by The Sunday Times a few months after the trial, making the case internationally known and depicting the Singapore government in a hostile manner. Robust "don't interfere in our internal affairs" retorts soon emerged from government circles.

When the public debates were over, the case was not completely forgotten. In his 1986 book The Tiger and the Trojan Horse, British author Dennis Bloodworth noted that "the ideograms in stone, chiselled by a sentient hand, were proof that this was the epitaph of a man, not a movement."

The tombstone today
Chay Wa's grave is in Choa Chu Kang Cemetery's Buddhist sector, grave number 3222, Block 8. It is difficult to locate, as it stands in a sea of tombstones that stretch almost as far as the eye can see. In 1985, it was reported that the inscription of the tombstone had been whited out with plaster by members of Tan's own family who wished to obscure any glorification of Chay Wa's "martyrdom" in the communist cause. At that time, all that could be seen clearly was a photograph of Chay Wa and some lettering showing his name and the years of his birth and death.

See also

Chin Peng
Chia Thye Poh

References

Notes

Bibliography

 
 
 
 

Trials in Singapore